Elda Ferri (born 12 November 1937) is an Italian film producer.

She is the administrator of the company Jean Vigo Italia S.r.l.. She co-produced the comedy Life Is Beautiful (1997) with Gianluigi Braschi, for which they both received an Academy Award nomination for Best Picture. The film also earned them a David di Donatello for Best Producer as well as a European Film Award for Best Film.

In 2005, she was awarded the prize of the "European producer of the year".

Notes

External links 
 

Italian film producers
People from Bologna
1937 births
Living people